Farrokh Khan (also spelled Ferouk Khan, Feruk Khan and Ferukh Khan), also known by his title of Amin od-dowleh, was a high-ranking Persian official, and vice premier to the court of the shah of Qajar Fath-Ale Shah. He was also the Persian ambassador to the emperor of France, Napoleon III, and the queen of Great Britain, Queen Victoria. The visit followed the outbreak of the Anglo-Persian War (1856–1857) between Persia and Great Britain.

Biography
Farrokh was born in 1812 to a family who belonged to the Ghaffari clan. He was the grandson of Ghazi Mo'ezz od-Din Mohammad Ghaffari, and a cousin of two painters named Abu'l-Hasan Mostafi and Abu'l-Hasan Sani od-Molk. When Farrokh was a young boy he was sent to the court of Fath-Ali Shah Qajar in Tehran. In 1833, he participated in Mohammad Mirza's siege of Herat. In 1836 Mohammad Shah sent Farrokh to Mazandaran to suppress a rebellion, which he managed to accomplish. One year later, he suppressed rebellions in Isfahan and Gilan. He later participated in the siege of Herat in 1838. In 1850 Mirza Taqi Khan (later known as Amir Kabir) appointed Farrokh as the tax-collector of all the Iranian provinces. Four years laters, Farrokh was appointed by Naser al-Din Shah Qajar as his treasurer.

In May 1856, Farrokh was given the title of "Amin od-Molk". In 1856, during another Iranian siege of Herat and a war with Great Britain, Farrokh was sent to the court of the French Emperor Napoleon III at Paris to negotiate with him. Furthermore, he was also given the objective to negotiate with the Ottoman ruler and the British and French diplomats in Constantinople to make a peace treaty with Great Britain.

Farrokh was accompanied by a suite of more than twenty persons, including councilors, dragoman, secretaries and writers. Six horses were given in present to the French Emperor, who expressed his regret about the conflict between Persia and Great Britain. Negotiations led to the Treaty of Paris in March 1857, which put an end to the Anglo-Persian War. During his three-year travels in Europe, Farrokh authored a detailed narration of his observations, which became an important source about the "West" for the Qajar court. While Farrokh's travel memoir has for long been noted for its diplomatic content, contemporary historians see it as source of inspiration towards social change in Iran. Dr. Vahid Vahdat, an architectural historian, argues that Farrokh's descriptions of European built environment took part in the formation of Iran's later experience of modernity.

Upon return from Europe, Farrokh was appointed as the Minister of Interior. Farrokh also encouraged the shah to send 42 students to Europe in order to receive a higher education, which would help in the progression of Iran. In April 1859, Farrokh was given title of "Amin ol-Dowleh", and was appointed as the tutor of prince Mass'oud Mirza Zell-e Soltan. In May 1866, Farrokh was appointed as the governor of Fars in southern Iran, including the provinces of central Iran.

Farrokh Khan later died from a heart attack on 5 May 1871, and was buried in Qom. His most known sons were Mohammad Ebrahim Ghaffari (1860-1918) and Mahdi Ghaffari (1865-1917). He is today most remembered for his patronage of Aminoddole Carvansarai in Kashan, Iran.

See also
 Franco-Persian alliance
 France-Iran relations

References

Sources

 
 

People from Kashan
1812 births
1871 deaths
19th-century Iranian politicians
People of Qajar Iran
Qajar governors of Gilan